Jerome Ngom Mbekeli (born 30 September 1998) is a Cameroonian footballer who plays as a midfielder for Beveren in the Challenger Pro League .

Career

Swope Park Rangers
In January 2019, Mbekeli joined USL Championship club Swope Park Rangers. After scoring twice against Bethlehem Steel, he was named to the USL Championship Team of the Week.

International
Mbekeli was named to Cameroon's roster for the 2022 FIFA World Cup. He was one of the few amateur players at the tournament, making approximately the minimum wage in his home nation of Cameroon.

References

External links
Jerome Ngom Mbekeli at Sporting Kansas City

https://www.national-football-teams.com/player/89014/Jerome_Mbekeli.html

1998 births
Living people
MFK Vyškov players
Sporting Kansas City II players
USL Championship players
Cameroonian footballers
Association football midfielders
San Diego Loyal SC players
S.K. Beveren players
2022 FIFA World Cup players
Expatriate soccer players in the United States
Cameroonian expatriate footballers
Cameroonian expatriate sportspeople in the United States
Footballers from Yaoundé
Cameroon A' international footballers
2022 African Nations Championship players
Cameroonian expatriate sportspeople in Belgium
Expatriate footballers in Belgium
Cameroonian expatriate sportspeople in the Czech Republic
Expatriate footballers in the Czech Republic